In mathematics, Sister Celine's polynomials are a family of hypergeometric polynomials introduced by . They include Legendre polynomials, Jacobi polynomials, and Bateman polynomials as special cases.

References

Polynomials